The 2017 National Pro Fastpitch season was the 14th season of professional softball under the name National Pro Fastpitch (NPF) for the only professional women's softball league in the United States.  From 1997 to 2002, NPF operated under the names Women's Pro Fastpitch (WPF) and Women's Pro Softball League (WPSL). Each year, the playoff teams battle for the Cowles Cup.

Milestones and events

The Dallas Charge announced that they would be relocating to San Marcos, Texas and changing their name to the Texas Charge.

On January 16, 2017, the NPF announced that the ownership of the Pennsylvania Rebellion would be dissolving the team, effective immediately.  All Rebellion players under contract were granted free agency.

On February 1, the Village of Rosemont announced it would be assuming ownership of the Bandits from previous owner Bill Sokolis.  The transaction included a $50,000 licensing fee paid to the NPF. Rosemont employee Toni Calmeyn will take over as general manager and will hire a new head coach.

Later in February Softball Australia and NPF announced an agreement that will allow at least eight players from the Australia women's national softball team to play for the Bandits.  This will increase the NPF's international profile, and allow the Australian players to compete against top-level talent.

On May 2, 2017, NPF announced the addition of an expansion team, Beijing Shougang Eagles.  Its roster is to be populated with members of China women's national softball team and selected American players. For 2017, the home half Beijing's schedule will be played in the home venues of the other NPF teams.  Beijing is expected to announce an permanent US home location in the future.

At the Pride's first home game at Space Coast Stadium, they announced that legendary pitcher Cat Osterman's jersey number 8 had been retired, commemorating it with a banner on the outfield fence.

On July 26, Brittany Mack-Oakes threw a no-hitter, beating the Eagles 6-1.

Monica Abbott threw the first no-hitter in Scrap Yard Dawgs' history on August 2, striking out 18.  It was her fourth professional no-hitter.

Rule changes
NPF held its annual winter meetings in Nashville from January 18–20, 2016. The following announcements were released after the meetings:

 Rosters were increased from a maximum of 23 players to 26.  However, only 23 of those on the roster can be active for a game.
 Team salary caps were increased from $150,000/team to $175,000.  NPF clarified that only the amount paid to a player counts against the salary cap, eliminating "signing bonus[es], performance incentives, improved living conditions, et al."
 The player minimum salary going forward is $3000.
 Teams that have tagged an athlete with the Franchise Player Tag are allowed to negotiate beyond the established player value.
 Extended a team's rights to retired player to permanent.
 Clarified that a player who retires must spend at least one full season out of NPF.
 A player's minimum age requirement was changed from 21 on January 1 of the season's calendar year to 21 at the time of the game.
 Removed the minimum amount for travel expenses. 
 Banned the use of bats that are not on an official list of NPF suppliers.
 Previously, NPF pitching rules mirrored the NCAA rules. Going forward, they are to follow World Baseball Softball Confederation rules.
 Previously, the penalties for an illegal pitch were a ball added to the batter's count and advancing baserunners one base.  Beginning in 2017, the penalty is only the ball added to the count.
 Player autograph sessions will continue in 2017, but teams must to make player safety a priority.  Sessions were suspended briefly in 2016 due to concerns about player safety.
 The 8th inning tie-breaker rule for doubleheaders previously applied to scheduled doubleheaders. In 2017, the rule will apply to all doubleheaders, including makeup doubleheaders.

Teams, cities and stadiums

Player acquisition

College draft

The 2017 NPF College Draft will be the 14th annual collegiate draft for NPF.

Notable transactions

Head Coaching Changes
 The Charge hired three-time Olympian Crystl Bustos to be their head coach. Arizona State assistant coach Roman Foore was hired as assistant coach.
 In July the Charge replaced Crystl Bustos with Roman Foore as head coach.
 The Dawgs hired Texas A&M associate head coach Gerry Glasco as their head coach.  Glasco's assistants will be Oregon's Jimmy Kolaitis and Joe Guthrie of Bucknell.
 Bandits head coach Mike Steuerwald stepped down and became assistant general manager of the Scrap Yard Dawgs.
 In February the Bandits hired University of Florida assistant coach Sharonda McDonald as their head coach.  McDonald was an All-NPF player, playing with the Philadelphia Force in 2007 and 2008, the Racers from 2010–12, and 2014 with the Pride.  Later, Chicago hired as their assistant coach Kyla Holas, who coached University of Houston from 1999-2016.  On June 8, the Bandits announced the hiring of Grinnell College alumna Annie Smith as assistant coach.
 The Racers hired two new assistant coaches, former Racers players Charlotte Morgan and Alison Owen.
 At a press conference in Beijing, the Eagles announced that Teresa Wilson would be their first head coach, with assistants Breanne Lewis and Thomas Hazelhurst.  Wilson had previously coached in the NCAA for 24 years and coached in the NPF in 2012 with the Carolina Diamonds.
 Citing a desire to focus on his position as coach of the Belmont Bruins softball team, Brian Levin stepped down as the Racers' head coach  Assistant coach Charlotte Morgan was promoted to replace him.

The Dallas Charge hired Scott Smith as their general manager.  Smith is the founder of the Texas Bombers, a softball organization with hundreds of players nationwide.

USSSA purchased Space Coast Stadium and announced renovations to make it a center for amateur softball and baseball with 15 fields.  The Pride announced it would be their new home stadium, beginning in 2017.

The Pride announced that former player and assistant coach Megan Willis was promoted to assistant general manager.

League standings

Results table

Game notes

NPF Championship

The 2017 NPF Championship was held at Tiger Park in Baton Rouge, La. on the LSU campus from August 17–20.  This was the first time this venue has been selected for the NPF Championship.

The Pride and Dawgs both swept their semifinal series 2 games to 0, against the Bandits and Racers, respectively.  USSSA was able to beat Monica Abbott in game one of the final series.  However, on the second day, Abbott pitched two complete games to clinch the championship for the Dawgs.  Abbott was named MVP of the championship.

Championship Game

Statistical leaders 

Source: http://npf.805stats.com/leaderboard.php

Players of the Week

Annual awards

The NPF's annual awards and All-NPF Team were announced at its league banquet, held August 16 at the Crowne Plaza in Baton Rouge, LA.  Kelly Kretschman won her third consecutive Player of the Year award, hitting a league-record .500.  Monica Abbott won her sixth overall Pitcher of the Year award.  A new award, Umpire of the Year, was presented for the first time.

The 2017 winners:

Notes

All-NPF Team

See also 

 List of professional sports leagues
 List of professional sports teams in the United States and Canada

Notes

References

External links 
 

Softball teams
Softball in the United States
2017 in women's softball
2017 in American women's sports